Huantar District is one of sixteen districts of the Huari Province in Peru.

Ethnic groups 
The people in the district are mainly indigenous citizens of Quechua descent. Quechua is the language which the majority of the population (92.86%) learnt to speak in childhood, 6.33% of the residents started speaking using the Spanish language (2007 Peru Census).

See also 
 Artisa
 Hatun Qaqaqucha and Ichik Qaqaqucha
 Kayish
 Map'arahu
 Qarwakancha

References

Districts of the Huari Province
Districts of the Ancash Region